Patriarch Paisius may refer to:

 Paisius I of Constantinople, Ecumenical Patriarch of Constantinople in 1652–1653
 Patriarch Paisius of Alexandria, Greek Patriarch of Alexandria in 1657–1678
 Paisius II of Constantinople, Ecumenical Patriarch of Constantinople for four times in the 18th century